Operation Hyacinth was a secret mass operation of the Polish communist police, carried out in the years 1985–87. Its purpose was to create national database of all Polish homosexuals and people who were in touch with them, and it resulted in the registration of around 11,000 people.

Beginnings
Officially, Polish propaganda stated that the reasons for the launch of the action were as follows:
 fear of the newly discovered HIV virus, as homosexuals were regarded as a group of high risk,
 control of homosexual criminal gangs
 fighting prostitution.

However, most probably, the Służba Bezpieczeństwa (SB) functionaries wanted to gather compromising evidence, which would later be used to blackmail involved individuals. Furthermore, those persons would be more willing to cooperate with the security services, also there are speculations that the operation was part of the wider action aimed at fighting the anticommunist opposition. SB agents were sent to check for opposition illegal movements in LGBT groups.

The Operation
Operation Hyacinth, upon order of Minister of Internal Affairs Czesław Kiszczak, began on November 15, 1985. On that morning, in different colleges, factories and offices across Poland, functionaries of the SB arrested numerous persons suspected of being homosexual or of having connections with homosexual groups. Those arrested had special files entitled Karta homoseksualisty (Card of a homosexual) and some of them were talked into signing a statement:

I (first name and last name) have been a homosexual since birth. I have had multiple partners in my life, all of them were adult. I am not interested in minors.

Apart from signing the document, those arrested were ordered to give their fingerprints, some of them were blackmailed into describing intimate parts of their sexual lives, and some were blackmailed into denouncing their colleagues.

The operation lasted until 1987, but files were added until 1988. It has been estimated that some 11,000 homosexuals were documented, and these files are now called "Różowe kartoteki" (Pink card index). Members of the LGBT community had asked the Institute of National Remembrance to destroy the files, but the IPN answered that it would have been illegal.

Aftermath
Due to Operation Hyacinth, members of the gay community decided to go "underground" and cover their sexual orientation even deeper, several of them left Poland and the operation itself was criticized by Western mass-media. The Polish government denied allegations, spokesman Jerzy Urban, asked in December 1988 by Kay Winthers of the Baltimore Sun, said that such an operation never took place.

The first person who became known as a victim of this operation was a gay rights activist Waldemar Zboralski.

On December 8, 1988, Professor Mikołaj Kozakiewicz discussed the operation with General Kiszczak. The latter admitted that Polish security services owned "pink files", but only with documentation of individuals involved in criminal activities. Kozakiewicz later said that he had evidence supporting the claim that files also covered those homosexuals who were not involved in crimes. During the same meeting, both discussed creation of the first, legal LGBT organization in Poland.

In September 2007, two LGBT activists, Szymon Niemiec and www.gaylife.pl's Jacek Adler, asked Institute of National Remembrance to open an investigation against "Communist crime" and General Kiszczak. On February 15, 2008, the Institute issued a statement in which it wrote that the operation was legal, in light of the 1980s regulations. The Institute refused to open an investigation, claiming that Hyacinth was an operation of preventive character, whose purpose was to infiltrate hermetic homosexual circles and their connections to organized crime. This decision was criticized among members of the LGBT community.

Action Hyacinth in Polish popular culture 

In 2015, the 30th anniversary of the event published two books telling of Action Hyacinth :

 "Pink files" (pol. "Różowe Kartoteki")  by Mikolaj Milcke (Polish ed. Dobra Literatura) - fictionalized history of right-wing politician, who in his youth was detained under Action Hyacinth
 "Codename Hyacinth" (pol. "Kryptonim Hiacynt") by Andrzej Selerowicz (Polish ed. Queermedia)

In October 2021, a Polish crime thriller Operation Hyacinth directed by Piotr Domalewski and starring Tomasz Ziętek was released on Netflix.

See also
Warsaw Gay Movement
Lavender scare

References

External links
Contents of the letter of Szymon Niemiec and Jacek Adler, sent to the IPN

1980s in Poland
LGBT history in Poland
Persecution of LGBT people